Ugar Khurd is a town and municipal council in the district of Belagavi, in the state of Karnataka, India. 

The town is famous for Ugar Sugar Works. It lies on the banks of mighty Krishna River. As per 2011 census the population of town is about 23,762, of whom almost 2,000 work in Ugar Sugar Works. Ugar is just 33 km from Sangli–Miraj twin cities and is emerging as a satellite town connected with Sangli, Miraj and Belagavi. 

"Khurd" is a place designation meaning 'small', originating from Persian language (see Khurd and Kalan). Ugar Khurd gradually outgrew the nearby village Ugar Budruk ('big Ugar').

Agriculture
The area surrounding Ugar has a very fertile black volcanic soil suited for sugar cane, cotton, jawar, sunflower and soyabeans. Due to proximity to Krishna river, the land is also fairly irrigated, and last four or five years Krishna river never went down the critical level.

Education
Ugar Sugar Works started production in the early 1940s, and it started a school for the families of workers, called Shri Hari Vidyalaya. The city has grown since, as has the school, which has steadily expanded its original reach of Marathi only mode of instruction to include both Kannada and English media. The school now also includes bachelor's degrees in Arts Commerce and science so the students will not have to move to nearby larger cities for their further education. It also offers a series of vocational courses including computer sciences.

There is a newly emerged school named Shri Guru Vidya English Medium School situated near railway station WEBSITE- . The medium of instruction is English. The school, started in 2013 is emerging to be one of the prominent school in the town. Apart from academics, the students in school have scope to learn many extracurricular activities like Karate, dance and many more.

The town of Ugar, now has a government run public school as well, Kannada Gandu Makkala Shale, which means 'Kannada Boys School'. However, the name is a misnomer as it is co-ed. This is for students in both Kannada and Marathi medium of instructions, but only from 1st grade to 7th, after which the students move on to Shri Hari Vidyalaya.

Ugar Sugar Works also operates a pre-school for much younger children ranging from age 4 to 6. The pre-school has many amenities for children including see-saw, swing, and ample space to play.

Transportation
The city is accessible by both road and railroad. By road it connects to Sangli, Miraj, Kolhapur, Belagavi, Bijapur, Bagalkot and Athani. By rail, it connects to two nearest cities Sangli Miraj in the north, and Belgaum in south. Since this Railroad connects Bangalore and Bombay, Ugar is conveniently connected to most of India.

Sangli and Miraj are two big railway stations from where people can reach Ugar.
Belgaum, the district headquarters, about 100 km from Ugar, has the nearest operational airport.

Visiting places
As such, Ugar does not boast of any visiting places, but it is near a few. Khidrapur is approximately 15 km from Ugar. Narsobawadi is 18 km away. Gokak Falls is a beautiful waterfall on river Ghataprabha, 50 km away, accessible by railroad. Chinchali is a village about 20 km away in which a major yearly jatra attracts more than a million visitors from both Karnataka and Maharashtra. Views of miles of bullock carts carrying millions of pilgrims to Chinchali is a spectacular summer event in towns such as Ugar. MaaSaheb dargah at Kudchi is about 7 km away.

Ugar has several beautiful temples of its own such as Mahadev temple on the river bank, Shri Raghavendra Matt, Lakshmi temple, Vittal temple, a Jain Mandir, Padmavati Temple and several mosques. Bank of river, pumping station, a small water barricade, ashram on the way of mangsuli, and shime laxmi are favourite picnic spots of Ugarkars.

Weekly farmers' market
Since the early 1950s, Ugar has had a weekly farmers' market, just behind Lakshmi temple on Thursdays and near the railway station on Sunday. Usually, people buy their weekly fresh agricultural products there. However, Ugar has grown since, and has had a permanent open tent market near the bus stand and near the railway station.

History, and the Ugar Sugar Works
The Ugar Sugar Works Ltd is the flagship organization of the Shirgaokar Group of Companies, and is by far the sole major employer. It employs approximately 6000 full-time employees, and many more seasonal employees. The annual revenues exceed INR 600 crores. The company has been involved in the manufacture of white crystal sugar for over 65 years. The group also has plants in Jewargi and Bagalkot. The total sugar crushing capacity is approximately 19,000 tcd a day.

USW is the main reason why the township of Ugar came into existence.

In the early 1940s, Ugar Khurd was a small hamlet in the erstwhile princely state of Sangli. However, it was blessed with a few distinct advantages: the perennial river Krishna, fertile black soil, and a railway station that could be used to transport goods. Then, the ruler of Sangli invited the late Dr.S.R.Shirgaokar, who had previous experience of setting up a sugar factory at Kolhapur.

Soon after setting a sugar plant, the company diversified its activities and started its own distillery in 1962–63. It added the liquor section in 1967–68. The company produces high quality premium brands like Old Castle Whisky, Gokak Falls Whisky, US Rum, Doctors Brandy, and Gagarin Vodka. The company's brands are well accepted by the market.

Thereafter, the company further diversified and set up a first-in-its-kind-in India Co-Generation Power Plant of 44 MW. This was based on the principle of bagasse based renewable sources of energy used as fuel. Out of this, 28 MW are being exported to the grid and the rest of the 16 MW are used for in-city consumption.

Migration
Ugar is a far more progressive town than any other nearby villages. As a result, it has seen its own side of migration in the 1990s and 2000s. Increased awareness among nearby villages to provide a quality education to their children and to provide a progressive city life has caused good deal of migration to Ugar. Many government and bank employees who works in nearby villages reside in Ugar.
Ugar has become a commercial center for many villages like Kudchi, Ainapur, Mangasuli, Shedbal, Kusnal, Kagawad, Shirguppi, and Chinchali.

Cities and towns in Belagavi district
Indian sugar industry